The following is a partial list of musicians from Denton, Texas, a city in North Texas in the United States.  Musicians and musical groups that began their careers in Denton, Texas—where the University of North Texas College of Music, 35 Denton, Denton Arts and Jazz Festival, and the Thin Line Fest are located—include:

 Andrew Savage
 Baboon
 The Baptist Generals
 Bosque Brown
 Bowling for Soup
 Brave Combo
 Brutal Juice
 Centro-Matic
 Circus della Morte
 Corn Mo
 Deep Blue Something
 Don Henley
 Eli Young Band
 Faktion
 Febrifuge
 Fishboy
 Flickerstick
 Lift to Experience
 The Marked Men
 Mazinga Phaser
 Meat Loaf
 Michael Martin Murphey
 Midlake
 Mingo Fishtrap
 Neon Indian
 Norah Jones
 Parquet Courts
 Pat Boone
 Polyphonic Spree
 Ralph Kirshbaum
 Ray Peterson
 Ray Wiley Hubbard
 The Riverboat Gamblers
 Robert Gomez
 The Rocket Summer
 Roy Orbison
 Sarah Jaffe
 Slobberbone
 Sly Stone
 Snarky Puppy
 Steve Fromholz
 Sub Oslo
 Teenage Cool Kids
 Tripping Daisy
 The Wee-Beasties
 William Basinski

See also
Music of Denton, Texas
Music of Texas
"The Best Ever Death Metal Band in Denton", a song by The Mountain Goats

References

External links
My Denton Music
Denton Live Music
35 Denton

Denton, Texas musicians
Denton, Texas musicians
Musicians
Lists by city in Texas